Manatha albipes is a moth of the family Psychidae first described by Frederic Moore in 1877. It is found in Sri Lanka.

References

Moths of Asia
Moths described in 1877
Psychidae